The Democratic Republic of East Timor, was a state that was unilaterally proclaimed on the territory of present-day East Timor on 28 November 1975 prior to the Indonesian invasion of East Timor nine days later on 7 December 1975.

History

Declaration of independence

East Timor was colonised by Portugal in the mid-16th century and administered as Portuguese Timor. After the 1974 Carnation Revolution in Portugal, a decolonisation process was initiated which was to have led to the formation of an elected Constituent Assembly in 1976. Three new parties emerged at this time; the Timorese Democratic Union which advocated continued association with Portugal, Fretilin which supported independence and Apodeti who supported integration into Indonesia. In local elections held on 13 March 1975, Fretilin and UDT emerged as the largest parties, having previously formed an alliance to campaign for independence.

On 11 August 1975, the UDT attempted a coup, in a bid to halt the increasing popularity of Fretilin. Portuguese Governor Mário Lemos Pires fled to the offshore island of Atauro, north of the capital, Dili, from where he later attempted to broker an agreement between the two sides.

On 28 November 1975, Fretilin made a unilateral declaration of independence of the Democratic Republic of East Timor with Francisco Xavier do Amaral as president and Nicolau dos Reis Lobato as prime minister. This act was not recognised by either Portugal or Indonesia.

Indonesian invasion

In response, on 30 November 1975, Indonesia encouraged leaders of the UDT, Apodeti, and other smaller parties to sign the Balibo Declaration calling for integration of East Timor into Indonesia. On 7 December 1975, Indonesian forces launched a massive air and sea invasion, known as Operasi Seroja (Operation Lotus), citing the potential for a communist government, the need to develop the territory and national and regional security risks as reasons for its actions. Indonesian forces occupied the capital, Dili, within hours of launching the invasion during the Battle of Dili and occupied the second largest city, Baucau, on 10 December, with Liquisa and Maubara being occupied in late December.

Subsequent events

On 17 December an Indonesian supported Provisional Government of East Timor (Pemerintah Sementara Timor Timur (PSTT)) was formed which was led by Arnaldo dos Reis Araújo of Apodeti and Lopez da Cruz of the UDT. A Regional Popular Assembly was established on 31 May 1976  which subsequently adopted a resolution calling for the formal integration of East Timor into Indonesia. On 17 July 1976, Indonesia formally annexed East Timor as the province of Timor Timur with Arnaldo dos Reis Araújo as its first governor.

The United Nations did not recognise either the self-styled "Democratic Republic" proclaimed by Fretilin or Indonesian sovereignty over East Timor and instead continued to recognise Portugal as the legal Administering Power as demonstrated by United Nations Security Council Resolution 384. This meant that in terms of international law Portuguese Timor nominally continued to exist. An agreement in 1999 between the governments of Portugal and Indonesia led to a referendum on 30 August 1999 in which a majority of the people of East Timor voted for independence. Following a transitional period of United Nations administration, East Timor became independent as the Democratic Republic of East Timor on 20 May 2002.

Text of the Declaration of Independence

Text
In Portuguese:

In English:

Government
Following the declaration of independence a Council of Ministers was formed with Francisco Xavier do Amaral as President and Nicolau dos Reis Lobato as Prime Minister.

Presidents

Prime Minister

International relations

Diplomatic recognition
Following the declaration of independence of the Democratic Republic of East Timor, the state received diplomatic recognition form six mainly socialist states.

The states that recognised the Democratic Republic of East Timor were as follows:

 People's Socialist Republic of Albania
 Cape Verde
 Guinea
 Guinea-Bissau
 People's Republic of Mozambique
 São Tomé and Príncipe

References

Government of East Timor
History of East Timor
History of Timor